Alexander Moreton Smith (born 16 July 1985) is an American former footballer who last played for Olympic FC. He has since moved into coaching roles at Melbourne City. He also holds Australian and British citizenship.

College soccer

Smith was born in Windsor, England, and moved to the United States at age one. He began his soccer career whilst at college in the United States. He played 17 times for Centenary College of Louisiana scoring six times with six assists. In 2004, he transferred to Southern Methodist University where he scored a further 13 in 19 appearances for the Mustangs. In his solitary year at SMU, he was selected to the Missouri Valley Conference 1st Team and the All-Midwest Region 2nd Team.

MLS
Smith travelled to England in 2005 to trial with Shrewsbury Town and Walsall. Returning to the US later in 2005, he was declared ineligible to continue playing college soccer by the NCAA. Because of Smith's NCAA ineligibility, he was unable to enter the MLS Superdraft. Smith was then classed as a discovery signing and after interest from MLS club Kansas City Wizards, he signed one-year contract with FC Dallas almost a year after his last game with Southern Methodist University. Smith would only feature in the reserves in his year with the MLS club, scoring on 2 occasions. Disillusioned with his stint in the MLS, Smith quit football at the age of 21.

Australia
After previously visiting Australia on holiday, he moved to Cairns in 2010, and later moved to Sydney. By this time he had started playing football again and decided to give football one more shot. In Sydney he signed for NSW Super League club Fraser Park and duly won the 2010 NSW Super League Player of the Year award.

Sydney Olympic
Smith signed for NSW Premier League club Sydney Olympic for the 2011 NSW Premier League season and was an immediate success, scoring a hat trick on debut against South Coast Wolves in Round 1 and scored the only goal in their 1–0 win over 2010 NSW Premier League champions Blacktown City. Smith played his final game for Olympic in the Round 12, 1–0 win over South Coast Wolves.

Gold Coast United
Smith had been invited to trial with Gold Coast United while he was playing for Fraser Park. Pleased by what he saw, and encouraged by his start with Sydney Olympic, United coach Miron Bleiberg signed Smith on a one-year contract for the 2011–12 A-League season. He officially joined their squad, and had his first proper training session on 17 June.

Despite Smith joining Gold Coast United for their pre-season, Bleiberg asked Smith to accept a contract pay out, in exchange for the immediate termination of his one-year contract, as Bleiberg wanted to sign former Blackburn Rovers striker Maceo Rigters, who had turned down a contract with Wellington Phoenix. On 1 September 2011 it was confirmed that Smith and United had reached an agreement in regards to the termination of his contract.

Return to Belmore
After being released from Gold Coast United , Smith returned to New South Wales where it was announced he would re-sign with Sydney Olympic. He arrived in time for the Final Round match of the NSW Premier League, against APIA Leichhardt Tigers, and picked up on where he left off, scoring the opening goal for Olympic in their 3–0 victory, in which Olympic were crowned Premiers. His return to Belmore would continue to be successful, with Smith opening the scoring in the 2011 NSW Premier League Grand Final against Sydney United. Olympic would go on to win 2–0, securing the first Premiership and Championship double since the NSL folded.

After spending the month travelling from Sydney to the Gold Coast, where he still resided, it was announced he would fly to Wellington, New Zealand to trial with Wellington Phoenix with a view to securing an injury replacement contract, with the hope of extending it to a full contract.

Wellington Phoenix
Smith signed a short-term contract with the Phoenix as an injury replacement player, for Mirjan Pavlovic who broke his arm while training. He made his A-League debut off the bench in the Round 2 victory against the Newcastle Jets in Wellington. On 18 January 2012 Smith's contract was made permanent lasting until the end of the season. Smith went on to make 24 appearances that season. It was then announced Smith had signed for the 2012–13 season. He started the first 11 games of the season but fell out of favour with coach Ricki Herbert. In June 2013 it was announced that Smith would not be offered a new deal with the club.

Far North Queensland Heat
In late 2013, Smith decided to sign with Far North Queensland FC. Citing a desire to give back and help develop some young players, Smith hoped to help the club develop. He was also awaiting his Australian citizenship, which would allow him a possible return to the A-League. While in Cairns, Smith held numerous coaching clinics, school clinics, holiday clinics and has also travelled to communities up in Cape York Peninsula, like Weipa, to help young football talents and coaches to better learn their game. Smith's first game for the Heat was against their rivals Northern Fury FC in Townsville. In the 44th minute, the captain scored the opening goal of FNQ FC Heat's 2014 campaign and his first goal for the club. Smith helped his side reach the inaugural FFA Cup round of 32 where they played away to Sydney United 58. Moreover, his 18 league goals guided the heat to a top two finish in only their second season since formation. However, his hat-trick in the Semi Final against Olympic FC was not enough to get the side into their first National Premier Leagues Queensland Grand Final.
In 2015, his goal scoring ability again helped his team reach the FFA Cup for a second consecutive year. In seven FFA Cup games in his time at the Heat, he scored 13 goals.

Malaysia
In early December 2015 it was announced that Smith had travelled to Malaysia to sign with Malaysia Premier League club NS Matrix for the 2016 season. Smith linked up with former Sydney Olympic FC player and coach Gary Phillips, who played the majority of his career with Sydney Olympic and won the 2001–02 National Soccer League as manager. After a successful individual season with NS Matrix, it was announced in December 2016 that Smith had signed with Johor Darul Ta'zim FC II for the 2017 Malaysia Premier League season. He spent a year at the club, scoring twice and helping the team to a 4th-place finish. He then decided to return to Australia to focus on his coaching development.

Return to Australia
Smith joined Olympic FC in May for the remainder of the 2018 NPL Queensland season. For the 2nd time in his career, he scored a hat trick on debut in the FFA Cup against Moreton Bay United FC. He went on to score 27 goals in 38 games for the club and guide the team to 2 consecutive NPL Queensland Grand Finals, however was unable to play in either due to injury. In his 8 FFA Cup games for the club he scored 7 goals. After playing with a ruptured ACL in the 2nd half of the 2019 season, Smith decided to retire and pursue his coaching career. In 2019, Smith won the NPL Queensland Player of the year award.

Coaching career

Brisbane Roar
While still playing at Olympic in 2019, Smith worked as a W-League Assistant Coach at Brisbane Roar.

Melbourne City
After retiring, Smith was appointed as an assistant coach at Melbourne City for their W-League team working under Head Coach Rado Vidošić. He also works in the Melbourne City Academy.

On the 8th of January 2023, Smith returned to Melbourne City FC as the Melbourne City FC (W-League) assistant coach, having been head hunted by interim Head Coach Dario Vidošić after his strong season with Peninsula Power, also working alongside goalkeeper Coach Jordan Franken. Smith's return coincided with a loss against Western Sydney Wanderers FC (A-League Women), their first win in 364 days.

Honours
Playing Honours
NSW Super League Player of the Year: 2010
NSW Premier League Premiership, Champion 2011
NSW Premier League Team of the Season 2011
NPL Queensland Team of the Season: 2014, 2019
NPL Queensland Player of the Year: 2019
Australia Cup Peninsula Power Goal Scoring Hero off the bench to advance to Quarter Finals for first time in Club history.

Coaching honours
W-League Premiership 2020
W-League Championship 2020
FQPL1 Premiers 2022 (Undefeated season)

References

External links
Wellington Phoenix profile
Sydney Olympic profile

1985 births
Living people
A-League Men players
Association football midfielders
Cairns FC players
DFW Tornados players
American expatriate sportspeople in Australia
American expatriate sportspeople in England
American soccer players
Expatriate footballers in Malaysia
Expatriate soccer players in Australia
FC Dallas players
Footballers from Berkshire
Fraser Park FC players
Gold Coast United FC players
Indiana Invaders players
Johor Darul Ta'zim II F.C. players
National Premier Leagues players
Negeri Sembilan FA players
Oakleigh Cannons FC players
SMU Mustangs men's soccer players
Sportspeople from Windsor, Berkshire
Sunshine Coast F.C. players
Sydney Olympic FC players
USL League Two players
Wellington Phoenix FC players
American expatriate sportspeople in Malaysia
American expatriate sportspeople in New Zealand
Expatriate association footballers in New Zealand